1983 Japanese Super Cup was the Japanese Super Cup competition. The match was played at National Stadium in Tokyo on March 27, 1983. Mitsubishi Motors won the championship.

Match details

References

Japanese Super Cup
1983 in Japanese football
Urawa Red Diamonds matches
Júbilo Iwata matches